Datanomic was a software engineering company based in Cambridge, England.

Founded in 2001, Datanomic was a UK-based software company developing data quality solutions.  In 2006, Datanomic acquired Tranato and integrated Tranato's semantic profiling and parsing capabilities with Datanomic's data auditing and cleansing to produce a new data quality application.  Launched in July 2007, dn:Director provided an end-to-end data quality tool kit encompassing, data profiling, auditing, cleansing and matching through a single graphical user interface and all written in Java.

Although dn:Director had capabilities to handle data quality issues in all kinds of data, Datanomic targeted its dn:Director application at business users with customer data quality challenges.  It adopted a strategy of building "applications", consisting of pre-configured rules and reference data, on top of the data quality platform to address specific business issues.  

Most successful of these was its Watchlist Screening application (in support of compliance with anti-money laundering and anti-terrorism know-your-customer regulation), which was adopted by clients including Barclays Bank, Bank of America, MetLife and Vodafone.

Datanomic was funded by private investors and venture capital companies 3i and DN Capital.  In July 2011, Datanomic was acquired by Oracle Corporation, which announced that it would combine Datanomic's technology with the Oracle product data quality capabilities it secured when it acquired Silver Creek Systems in 2010; the new combined suite is known as Oracle Enterprise Data Quality. Datanomic's compliance screening application has also been persisted as Oracle Watchlist Screening.

References

Further reading

External links 
Case study: Data Excellence at the London Borough of Brent, finalist in the e-Government National Awards 2008
Release of dn:Director
Datanomic acquired by Oracle
Oracle announcement of Datanomic acquisition

Software companies of the United Kingdom
Oracle acquisitions